Predrag Miloš (born 13 May 1955) is a Serbian former swimmer who competed in the 1972 Summer Olympics and in the 1976 Summer Olympics.

His twin brother Nenad Miloš is also a retired swimmer who has competed in multiple Olympics (1976, 1972, and 1982) -- each time without winning a single medal.

References

1955 births
Living people
Serbian male swimmers
Male backstroke swimmers
Olympic swimmers of Yugoslavia
Swimmers at the 1972 Summer Olympics
Swimmers at the 1976 Summer Olympics
Yugoslav male swimmers
Mediterranean Games silver medalists for Yugoslavia
Mediterranean Games bronze medalists for Yugoslavia
Swimmers at the 1971 Mediterranean Games
Swimmers at the 1975 Mediterranean Games
Mediterranean Games medalists in swimming